Kaare Klint (15 December 1888 – 28 March 1954) was a Danish architect and furniture designer, known as the father of modern Danish furniture design. Style  was epitomized by clean, pure lines, use of the best materials of his time and superb craftsmanship.

He was the son of the equally influential architect Peder Vilhelm Jensen-Klint whose monumental Grundtvig's Church he completed after his father's death in 1930.

Early life and education
Kaare Klint was born on 15 December 1888 in the Frederiksberg district of Copenhagen, the son of Peder Vilhelm Jensen-Klint, then a struggling painter about to abandon his artistic career in place of a more secure career in architecture.

Klint apprenticed as a furniture maker in Kalundborg and Copenhagen from 1893 and took classes at technical school in Copenhagen, Jens Møller-Jensens furniture school, and the Artists' Studio Schools under Johan Rohde. He was then articled to Carl Petersen and was also taught the architectural trade by his father, who had completed his first architectural project in 1896.

Design career
In 1914, Klint designed his first piece of furniture, the Faaborg Chair, for Carl Petersen's Faaborg Museum  in 1914. He went on to create furniture and fittings for a number of other museums.

From 1921 to 1926 he was responsible for the conversion of Frederiks Hospital into the Danish Museum of Art & Design together with Thorkild Henningsen and Ivar Bentsen. In 1927 he also created a chair in mahogany for the museum which was inspired by English 18th-century chairs. 

 
Klint's carefully researched furniture designs are based on functionality, proportions adapted to the human body, craftsmanship, and the use of high-quality materials. Notable examples of his work include the Propeller Stool (1927), the Safari Chair and the Deck Chair (both 1933), the Church Chair (1936), and the Circle Bed (1938) featuring curved sides and rounded ends, with hand-woven textiles by Lis Ahlmann. 

As a result of the furniture school he founded at the Royal Academy in 1924, Klint had a strong influence on Danish furniture, inspiring designers such as Poul Kjærholm and Børge Mogensen. 

He also designed textiles, lamps, and organs.

Completion of his father's unfinished works
After his father's death in 1930, Kaare Klint completed his monumental Grundtvig's Church in Copenhagen. Construction had started in 1921 but was not completed until 1940. He also designed the Bethlehem Church, also in Copenhagen, on the basis of his father's sketches. It was built from 1935 to 1937.

Awards and distinctions
 1949 Honorary Royal Designer for Industry, London
 1954 C. F. Hansen Medal

Notable designs

See also
Le Klint
Danish modern

References

External links
 Monography (2919)]
Klintiana Center for the study of Kaare Klint’s architecture and design

Literature
 Harkær, Gorm: Kaare Klint, 2010, Copenhagen: Klintiana, Vol 1: 660 p., Vol 2: 160 p. .

1888 births
1954 deaths
Danish furniture designers
Danish architects
Designers from Copenhagen
People from Frederiksberg
Academic staff of the Royal Danish Academy of Fine Arts
Danish modern
Recipients of the Eckersberg Medal
Recipients of the C.F. Hansen Medal